José Ignacio Suárez Peredo y Bezares (born 1834 in Orizaba) was a Mexican clergyman and bishop for the Roman Catholic Archdiocese of Xalapa. He was ordained in 1856. He was appointed bishop in 1887. He died in 1894.

References 

1834 births
1894 deaths
Mexican Roman Catholic bishops
People from Orizaba